Engelier is a 310-mile (500-kilometers) large crater on Saturn's moon Iapetus in Saragossa Terra. It partially obscures the slightly smaller crater Gerin.

See also 
List of geological features on Iapetus

Notes

Impact craters on Saturn's moons
Surface features of Iapetus (moon)